Cyganka  is a village in the administrative district of Gmina Panki, within Kłobuck County, Silesian Voivodeship, in southern Poland.

The village has a population of 158.

References

Cyganka